Pringi may refer to several places in Estonia:

Pringi, Harju County, village in Viimsi Parish, Harju County
Pringi, Valga County, village in Sangaste Parish, Valga County